Evil Twin is a 2007 South Korean horror film.
When an accident claims the life of a young girl, Hyo-jin. Her twin sister, So-yeon fell into a coma and awakens 10 years later. Many deaths follows her recovery, and she seemingly takes on her sister's personality traits.

Plot 
The movie begins with a young woman being strangled by a man. The man strangling her is accusing her of murder. A series of flashbacks show two little girls playing on a bridge and falling into the water.

Three men are sitting and drinking, asking each other what they would do if they saw a ghost. Two of the men make fun of the third about his stuttering and cowardice. The stutterer says that they would be scared too if they met dead Hyo-jin. The third man makes an excuse and leaves. While walking home, he glances nervously at a bridge and pretends not to see it. He then sees a woman with long hair covering her face. Frightened, he attempts to pretend he doesn't see her either but the woman appears in front of him.

A young woman, So-yeon, wakes up from a creepy dream in the hospital, finding her mother beside her. The doctor informs them that she has lost her memories. So-yeon is taken home and pampered, tended to by a servant who tells her that she has been in a coma for ten years. So-yeon has a vision of drowning and develops chest pains after overhearing of a man drowned in a ditch. She goes directly to where the body was, arousing the curiosity of her servants. Far in the distance, she sees the body being carried away: the stuttering man from earlier.

The servants in the kitchen talk about So-yeon's twin sister Hyo-jin. When they were young, both girls fell off a bridge into the water. Hyo-jin drowned, while So-yeon went into a coma. Hyo-jin, was said to be her father's favorite while their mother had always favored the eldest, So-yeon. So-yeon was said to have been a nasty child and often bullied Hyo-jin.

Hearing about So-yeon's recovery, Hyun Sik, So-yeon's fiancé, is ordered by his mother to visit her. He is reluctant to see her as he was in love with Hyo-jin and was devastated by her death. Hyun Sik meets So-yeon, and she mentions that she remembers playing with him when they were kids. Hyun Sik also remembers that day. He was happily playing with Hyo-jin but So-yeon found them, becomes jealous and hit Hyo-jin, resulting in a scar. Angry at the memory, Hyun Sik walks away.

After a series of mysterious killings, it is revealed that the one killed in the water ten years ago was not Hyo-jin but So-yeon: the living twin is actually Hyo-jin. The secret was hidden by her mother, who had been telling the villagers that Hyo-jin was dead and the one alive was So-yeon, since she was her favorite. But the dreadful spirit of the real So-Yeon came back to take revenge. Facing the spirit of the real So-yeon, Hyo-jin and their mother run to the bridge, and Hyo-jin falls into the lake. The mother tries to save her, but she grabs the hand of So-yeon, and, finally seeing Hyo-jin, also grabs Hyo-jin's. Both beg their mother to save them. Hyo-jin tells her mother that she is okay, and the mother lets go of Hyo-jin's hand.  The mother then falls into the lake to embrace So-yeon's spirit who is finally comforted and persuaded to let go of her vengeance against Hyo-jin; So-yeon and her mother sink to the bottom of the lake together. Hyun Sik runs to the bridge, presumably saving Hyo-jin. The film ends with Hyun Sik and Hyo-jin, probably married to each other, on the bridge.

Cast 
 Park Shin-hye ... So-yeon/Hyo-jin
 Jae Hee ... Hyun-sik
 Yang Geum-seok ... So-yeon's mother
 Park Myeong-sin
 Yang Jin-woo
 Han Yeo-woon
 Bae Yoon-beom
 Jeong Sang-hoon
 Bang Eun-mi
 Choi Soo-han

References 

 Lee Hyo-won (17 May 2008). ‘Evil Twin’: Return of Korean Horror. The Korea Times. Retrieved on 12 October 2008.
 Film: “The Hometown of Legends” . The Dong-A Ilbo (17 May 2007). Retrieved on 12 October 2008.
 Kim, Kyu Hyun. The Evil Twin. Koreanfilm.org. Retrieved on 12 October 2008.
 Mudge, James (22 September 2007). The Evil Twin (2007) Movie Review. BeyondHollywood.com. Retrieved on 12 October 2008.

External links 
 Evil Twin at the Korean Movie Database
 Evil Twin at HanCinema
 

2007 films
South Korean horror films
2000s Korean-language films
2007 horror films
Twins in fiction
2000s South Korean films